4-Oxo-2-nonenal is a lipid peroxidation product that can structurally alter proteins and induce α-synuclein oligomers.

References 

Conjugated aldehydes